The Mr. Backup Z64 is a game backup device designed by Harrison Electronics, Inc., able to store Nintendo 64 games as ROM images on Zip Diskettes.  Units such as this can make copies of a game which can be played in a Nintendo 64 emulator.

Design 

Unlike the Doctor V64, which plugs into the expansion slot in the bottom, this backup unit plugs into the cartridge slot, so the Nintendo 64 perceives it as a regular game cartridge. The unit features an upgradable BIOS, a basic back lit black text LCD panel, and buttons enabling users to unlock and use features of this backup unit. Some units include the ability to add Game Genie codes and various other cheats and saved games.

Hardware revisions 

The original Z64 has a hardware set limit of 128 megabits. Because it is not capable of addressing any RAM above 16 megabytes, the user can not upgrade the RAM in order play bigger games. Once 256 megabit games became more prevalent, the parent company released hardware version 2.0 which includes a fully addressable 32 megabyte RAM chip, allowing the larger games to play. The 1.0 units can not be upgraded to 2.0. No further hardware revision has been made to allow for the playing of the few 512 megabit games that were released.

Features 

Features of the Z64 include the following:

 Independently operating without connecting to computers or any peripherals
 Simple installation, plug and play with only a few buttons
 Capable of automatically detecting a defective game cartridge
 Capable of backing up game cartridge data into Zip Disk
 Capable of playing games from the cartridge
 Capable of playing game files stored on the Zip Disk
 Capable of storing the game record on EEPROM and SRAM
 Capable of clearing data files stored in the diskette
 With built-in 256 megabit memory (32 megabyte DRAM)
 With built-in ZIP-100 disk drive
 Store average 6–12 files in one ZIP-100 diskette
 Average 16–64 seconds to back up each cartridge depending on game size
 Flash BIOS for convenient upgrade from Zip Disk

Specifications 

The Z64's system specifications are the following:

 Range of operating temperature: 0 to 55 °C*
 Range of Storage Temperature: -25 to + 80 °C
 Net Weight: 1.5 kg
 Power: 5 W
 Input: 100–240 V AC, 0.2 A
 Output: DC +5 V / Maximum: 1.6 A
 Dimension: 24 cm x 14 cm x 13 cm (L x W x H)
 Internal RAM: 256 Mbits (32 MB, 8x32 72-pin NP EDO SIMM) Standard 
 Media: 100 MB PC format Zip disk
 CPU: 386SX/40 MHz 
 BIOS: Flashable

References

External links 
 Mr. Backup Z64 user manual
 Z64 FAQ Mirror

Nintendo 64 accessories
Unlicensed Nintendo hardware